Antonio Manuel Leon Candia (born August 4, 1982) is a Paraguayan former swimmer, who specialized in breaststroke events. During his sporting career, he represented Paraguay, as an eighteen-year-old, at the 2000 Summer Olympics, and in all four editions of the FINA World Championships since 2001. Leon also trained for Deportivo de Puerto Sajonia, under his longtime coach and mentor Roberto Colmán.

Leon competed only in the men's 100 m breaststroke at the 2000 Summer Olympics in Sydney. He received a Universality place from FINA, without meeting an entry time. He participated in heat one against two other swimmers Kieran Chan of Papua New Guinea and Joe Atuhaire of Uganda. Leon pulled away from a small field, and opened up his lead to a top seed in a new Paraguayan record of 1:08.12. Leon failed to advance into the semifinals, as he placed sixty-first overall on the first day of prelims.

References

1982 births
Living people
Paraguayan male swimmers
Olympic swimmers of Paraguay
Swimmers at the 2000 Summer Olympics
Pan American Games competitors for Paraguay
Swimmers at the 2003 Pan American Games
Male breaststroke swimmers
Sportspeople from Asunción
20th-century Paraguayan people
21st-century Paraguayan people